The Round Barn, Buckingham Township is an historic building located north of Traer in Tama County, Iowa, United States. It was built in 1920 as a general purpose barn. The building is a true round barn that measures  in diameter. The structure is constructed in clay tile from the Johnston Brothers' Clay Works and features an aerator and a segmented two-pitch roof. It has been listed on the National Register of Historic Places since 1986.

References

Buildings and structures completed in 1920
Buildings and structures in Tama County, Iowa
National Register of Historic Places in Tama County, Iowa
Barns on the National Register of Historic Places in Iowa
Round barns in Iowa